Ist is a small island off the Dalmatian coast of Croatia. The closest city to Ist is Zadar. The island has an area of 9.65 km2. Ist is located between the islands of Škarda and Molat.

The entire island has a permanent population of 182. During the past 50 years it has witnessed a slow depopulation which has halved its number of inhabitants. The Croatian Government is attempting to attract people to the island through its National Programme of Islands’ Development as well as economic revival (which could result in the construction of a bridge to nearby Molat). Recently the island has benefited from the development of tourism.

In World War II, the Battle of Ist was a naval engagement off Ist on 29 February 1944.  The engagement was fought between Free French navy destroyers and a Kriegsmarine force of two corvettes, two torpedo boats and three minesweepers which were protecting a freighter.  The French managed to destroy the German freighter and a corvette without losses of their own before withdrawing.

See also 
Croatia
Dalmatia

References

External links 
Socio-Geographic Transformation of Ist Island, Croatia

Islands of Croatia
Islands of the Adriatic Sea
Populated places in Zadar County
Landforms of Zadar County